The Federal Civil Defense Administration (FCDA) was organized by President Harry S. Truman on December 1, 1950, through Executive Order 10186, and became an official government agency via the Federal Civil Defense Act of 1950 on 12 January 1951. In 1958 the FCDA was superseded by the Office of Civil and Defense Mobilization when President Dwight D. Eisenhower merged the FCDA with the Office of Defense Mobilization.

In its early years, the agency focused on evacuation as a strategy.

The FCDA was first headed by Millard Caldwell under Truman, then Val Peterson under Eisenhower.

Background

The predecessor to the FCDA, the Office of Civilian Defense was abolished in June 1945 with the end of World War II. In the period between the end of the World War and 1949, when the Soviet Union detonated their first atomic weapon, little was given to the topic of civil defense. After the Soviets demonstration of their first atomic weapon there was a feeling of the need to do something throughout both the American public and government. This led to, among many actions, the creation of the Federal Civil Defense Administration by President Harry S. Truman in 1950.

Administrators
Millard Caldwell, December 1, 1950 – November 15, 1952
Jerry Wadsworth, November 15, 1952 – February 20, 1953 
Val Peterson, February 19, 1953 – June 14, 1957 
Lewis Berry, June 14, 1957 – July 19, 1957 
Leo Hoegh, July 19, 1957 – July 1, 1958

See also

Federal Civil Defense Authority
United States civil defense
Duck and Cover (film)
CONELRAD

References

Defunct agencies of the United States government
Government agencies established in 1950
United States civil defense
1950 establishments in the United States